Franz Lindt (born 11 September 1844 in Bern - died 17 November 1901 in Bern) was a Swiss politician who served as the sixth mayor of Bern.

Personal life 
Lindt graduated from the engineering School of Federal Polytechnic in Zürich.

Political career 
After a brief stay abroad he became Adjunct at Bern Kantonsgeometer Franz Rudolf Jacob pipe. After this, he had been elected to the Executive Council in 1872, Lindt took office as Kantonsgeometer. In 1894 he was elected to the Grand Council of the Canton of Bern, where he took over the building department.
 
After Mayor Eduard Müller was elected in the Federal Council in 1895, Lindt took over the office of Mayor of Bern. In 1899 he resigned because of a back injury leaving him incapable to fulfill his duties as Mayor.

See also 
 List of mayors of Bern

Mayors of Bern
1844 births
1901 deaths